Sand animation is the manipulation of sand to create animation. In performance art an artist creates a series of images using sand, a process which is achieved by applying sand to a surface and then rendering images by drawing lines and figures in the sand with one's hands. A sand animation performer will often use the aid of an overhead projector or lightbox (similar to one used by photographers to view translucent films). To make an animated film, sand is moved on a backlit or frontlit piece of glass to create each frame.

History 

Techniques of animating with sand were pioneered by Caroline Leaf when she was an undergraduate art student at Harvard University in 1968. She created her first film, Sand, or Peter and the Wolf (1968), by dumping beach sand on a light box and manipulating the grains to build figures, textures and movement, frame by frame. In the 1970s, Eli Noyes, another Harvard graduate, created the short film Sandman (1973) and the Sand Alphabet (1974), which became a feature on the children's educational television program Sesame Street. In 1977, The Sand Castle by Dutch-Canadian animator Co Hoedeman won the Academy Award for Best Animated Short Film. In 2006, Gert van der Vijver created the series De Zandtovenaar ("The Sand Magician") on Dutch national television and since then, animates for the yearly outdoor play The Passion.

Notable artists

Ferenc Cakó
 Su Dabao
 Co Hoedeman
 Alexandra Konofalskaya
 Caroline Leaf
 Eli Noyes
 Kseniya Simonova
 Ilana Yahav

References

External links

 An explanation of how to make animated films with sand animation
 Marcos Magalhães' "Animando" at NFB.ca
 Caroline Leaf's film The Owl Who Married a Goose at NFB.ca

 
Animation techniques
Visual arts media
Performance art
Animation